Saaremaa Velotuur ('Tour of Saaremaa') was a cycling competition which took place in Saare County, Estonia.

First competition was in 1957.

Last 20 years, the main organizer of the competition was Riho Räim.

Winners

 1957 Jaan Siiner
 1958 Toivo Ladoga
 1959 Arnold Perner

References

External links
 Saaremaa Velotuur, at cyclingarchives.com

Defunct cycling races in Estonia
Saare County